Hartford Mill was a Grade II-listed building located off Block Lane, in the Freehold area of Oldham, UK.

History 
It was constructed as a cotton-spinning mill in 1907. Frederick Whittaker Dixon designed it for the Hartford Mill (Oldham) Company Ltd. It was extended in 1920 and 1924. It was Grade II-listed on 8 March 1993.  In 1991, Littlewoods vacated the building, and it has been unoccupied since then. A fire significantly damaged it in 2014, and a teenager died after falling through the roof of the building in 2015. It was proposed for demolition in 2018. Demolition of the mill is currently underway. The chimney will be dismantled piece by piece, as explosives would pose a risk to the neighbouring school and houses. The demolition was due to be completed in August 2020, however was behind schedule due to the COVID-19 pandemic. Demolition restarted in July 2021.

References 

Oldham
Grade II listed buildings in the Metropolitan Borough of Oldham